Maria Lalou (born in 1977) is a Greek contemporary conceptual artist, critical thinker and scholar. She explores the topic of viewing, incorporating cinematic apparatus and surveillance as part of her tools, with central references to the politics of the viewer. Her works negotiate about the notion of ‘viewing’   as a civic negotiation, by the means of a performative act, an active presence,  an empirical duration, a filmic artefact and a political statement.  Her art works are in the edge of social experiments and practised rhetorics by staging art installations on the steps of theory of the spectacle. She includes the viewer’s perspective in the completion of the works' significance, dividing her audiences in specific audience as the chosen viewers participating in her works and casual audience as the invited public to experience the works results she has directed with the contribution of significant others. On the strong conceptual tracks that Stephen Willats has marked, her artistic practise is based on cognitive models in the spectrum Installation Art, Performance Art, Art Film and  Art Publications, negotiating with rules of Institutions.

From her early stage in the Arts, she started composing performance-installations within the content of pseudo-scientific environments. A significant tool in her work is that particular identity of the white coat. The way Lalou is using the perception of her audiences is making her works critical to cultural norms, while experimenting with the boundaries of speculative theory and art making as a whole. In her research on the topic of view she has been including her article written for Roehampton University peer reviewed magazine and her first artist's book publication [θέατρο]  in 2015. Being in the core of her instigations on the camera apparatus and its subjective role in society,  her second book and art manifesto 'the camera' gets published at the end of 2019. In parallel, since 2012 she has an ongoing collaboration with the Danish architect Skafte Aymo-Boot, on their archival research in the un-finished concrete volumes of 'polykatoikia' in the city of Athens. The work is about concrete skeletons of Athens that engages the viewer in a process of looking into social, political and personal parts of the history of the city. Lalou and Aymo-Boot book Atlas of Athens' Incomplete Buildings-A Story of Hidden Antimonuments gets published in Autumn 2022 by Jap Sam Books in The Netherlands. Since early 2004 Lalou is sharing her time between the two cities of Athens and Amsterdam.



Work 
Lalou’s work is based on her on going research on the ‘mechanisms of the seen’ that started as an attempt to deconstruct ‘the political’ of the viewer. The research is focused on the role of the camera apparatus: its significance in the commons, its personification in the private, its appropriation in the surveillance of everyday networked reality and its potentiality as a weapon of truth in recording history. Lalou’s works formulate a precise frame, often a distilled, almost lab-like setting, integrating the performative act of viewing into the production of each work and treating it as a major signifier. Her presence within her works manifests as an operator of the ‘mechanisms of the seen’. 
Through a cross discipline methodology Lalou is often constructing large scale staged settings where independent professionals are under their own personal identity and social role, been aware that the material collected and the camera registration will be part of her on going archive on observations in the politics of viewing.

Through these principles in 2015 and with herself on stage under the role of the operator she structured her first feature film filmed with the various types of cameras handled all by her invited guests as a silent movie of 144 min with title OPERATED, produced in Amsterdam. She curated and directed the performative experiment "OPERATED"  with the actual performance and contribution of Michaela Lakova, Geirthrudur Hjorvar, Paula Albuquerque, Barbara Phillip, Rune Peitersen, Alex Zakkas, Esma Moukhtar, Katja Sokolova, Eva Shippers and Celine Wouters, that open to the public as an exhibition "The Operational Model, including a film "OPERATED" made by all. In 2018 she recorded her first feature film 'The Dialogue' during her 8 month working period in New York, along with Knut Åsdam, Andrew Fremont-Smith, Jennifer Uleman and Andreas Wimmer.

Biography 
Maria Lalou is an artist and thinker born in Athens, Greece and a Fulbright Scholar.
She is educated in Interior Architecture and Design from the Technological Educational Institute of Athens and in Fine Arts from the Gerrit Rietveld Academie in Amsterdam. She was granted a research period in Copenhagen in the Royal Danish Academy of Fine Arts (former Denmarks Designskole) and followed and intense research in ‘theatre’ at the DasArts in Amsterdam. She has been a lecturer at Fine Arts and Architecture of Princeton University, Princeton; Architecture of ETH, Zurich; Aalto University of Helsinki, Finland, Rijksacademie Studios, Amsterdam Cittadellarte-Fondazione Pistoletto, Biella, Italy; and Università IUAV di Venezia, Venice, amongst others. She has contributed to the peer review journal activate, University of Roehampton , London, as well at Leonardo, MIT Press Journals. Since 2012, along with her autonomous work, Lalou works with the Danish architect Skafte Aymo-Boot in the collective practise of contemporary archeology. In 2020, Lalou & Aymo-Boot co-founded “Cross Section Archive" a space for Art & Architecture in Athens, investigating phenomena that occur in the intersection of the disciplines, exploring how historical facts, political structures and everyday circumstances have been interfering, co-producing and directing them.

Selected exhibitions 
Maria Lalou’s works have been presented internationally at Printed Matter, Inc, New York; LIMA, Amsterdam; Onomatopee, Eindhoven; Galeria Rondo Sztuki, Katowice, Poland; and Contemporary Art Museum of Thessaloniki, Greece; Motto, Berlin, Germany amongst others.

References 

1977 births
Living people
21st-century Greek women artists
Artists from Athens
Conceptual artists
Greek experimental filmmakers
Greek performance artists
Gerrit Rietveld Academie alumni